Ian Lewis may refer to:
 Ian Lewis (computer scientist) (born 1961), British computer scientist
 Ian Lewis (cricketer) (1935–2004), Irish cricketer